Thomas Lawrence Knight (born 22 January 1993) is an English actor best known for playing Luke Smith in The Sarah Jane Adventures and Doctor Who, Kevin Chalk in Waterloo Road, murder victim Caleb "Cal" Bray in Glue and Brodie in Victoria.

Personal life
Born in Chatham, Kent, Knight is the middle of five siblings (3 boys, 2 girls), all of whom act. He attended Delce Junior School in Rochester from year 4 onwards and formerly attended the Sir Joseph Williamson's Mathematical School.

Knight was in a relationship with Waterloo Road co-star Abby Mavers from 2012 to 2017.

Career
Knight started in West End Theatre with Deborah Warner's production of Euripides' Medea, (Queens Theatre, 2001), and has since appeared in Chitty Chitty Bang Bang, (London Palladium, 2002), The Snowman, (Peacock Theatre, 2003), The Full Monty, (UK National Tour, 2004) and the Royal Shakespeare Company's Macbeth (Albery Theatre, 2005).

Additional television performances include roles in TV to Go, (BBC, 2002), Casualty, (BBC, 2005, 2007 and 2015), The Impressionists, (BBC, 2006), Sorted, (BBC, 2006), Doctors (BBC, 2006), and The Bill (Talkback Thames, 2006 and 2009), and Myths (BBC, 2008).

Knight is best known for playing Luke Smith, adoptive son of Sarah Jane Smith, in the first three series of The Sarah Jane Adventures (2007, 2008, 2009) and in the 2008 Doctor Who episodes "The Stolen Earth" and "Journey's End". He was featured in the second part of "The End of Time", the two-part 2009 Doctor Who Christmas specials. He was written out as a regular on The Sarah Jane Adventures in the first serial of the fourth series in 2010, when Luke drives off to Oxford University, however he continued to make semi-regular appearances in the show up to the end of the fifth and final series, usually via webcam from his dorm room. His final appearance was in the show's final episode, "The Man Who Never Was".

He also featured in a CEOP e-Safety Video "Tom's Story", which can be watched on YouTube. Knight featured in a darker role in a 2012 independent UK horror film, A Suburban Fairytale, in which he acted alongside real life sister Yohanna Farrel in an incestuous and murderous role. He joined Waterloo Road in 2012, first appearing in episode 8 of series 8 playing Kevin Skelton. His notable storylines included being adopted by teacher Daniel Chalk (and thus changing his name to Kevin Chalk), his relationship with Dynasty Barry, having an affair with a teaching assistant and most recently suffering a stroke before a university interview. He left Waterloo Road in Series 10 Episode 12.

In 2014, he appeared as murder victim Cal in the E4 drama series Glue. Most recently, he played Hall Boy Brodie in Victoria, a period drama starring Waterloo Road and Doctor Who alumnus, Jenna Coleman.

List of credits

Advertisements

Television

Film

Online

Theatre

Radio/Audio

References

External links

 
 Tommy Knight Profile

1993 births
English male film actors
English male child actors
English male television actors
Living people
People from Chatham, Kent
People educated at Sir Joseph Williamson's Mathematical School
Male actors from Kent
21st-century English male actors
English male stage actors